Chrášťany is a municipality and village in Kolín District in the Central Bohemian Region of the Czech Republic. It has about 700 inhabitants.

Administrative parts
Villages of Bylany and Chotouň are administrative parts of Chrášťany.

Notable people
Procopius of Sázava (?–1053), saint; born in Chotouň according to legend

References

Villages in Kolín District